Harrodsburg is a home rule-class city in Mercer County, Kentucky, United States. It is the seat of its county. The population was 9,064 at the 2020 census.

Although Harrodsburg was formally established by the Virginia House of Burgesses after Boonesborough and was not incorporated by the Kentucky legislature until 1836, it is usually considered the oldest city in Kentucky and has been honored as the oldest permanent American settlement west of the Appalachians.

History

18th century
Harrodstown (sometimes Harrod's Town) was laid out and founded by James Harrod on June 16, 1774. Harrod led a company of adventurers totaling 31 men, beginning May 25 at Fort Redstone in Pennsylvania down the Monongahela and Ohio Rivers in canoes and through a series of other rivers and creeks to the town's present-day location.

Later that same year, amid Dunmore's War, Lord Dunmore sent two men to warn the surveyors of imminent Shawnee attacks, Daniel Boone and Michael Stoner, who are said to have completed the round trip of 800 miles in 64 days. Regardless, the pioneers remained for a few weeks until a man was killed by the natives, when the settlement was abandoned and resettled the following year by March. It was one of three settlements in present-day Kentucky at the time the Thirteen Colonies declared independence in 1776, along with Logan's Fort and Boonesborough. Also known as Oldtown, Harrodstown was the first seat of Virginia's Kentucky (1776), Lincoln (1780), and Mercer (1785) Counties upon their formations. It remains the seat of Mercer County in Kentucky.

A census taken between Dec. 16, 1777, and Oct. 16, 1778, lists 52 residents, several of whom were well-known pioneers and frontiersmen, including Daniel Boone's younger brother, Squire Boone, Silas Harlan, the Kentucky county's namesake, James Harrod, Hugh McGary, Isaac Hite and his cousins, Isaac and John Bowman, and David Glenn, who later travelled further west and settled in Yellow Banks (present Daviess County). David Glenn, along with his brother Thomas, and Silas Harlan, with his brother James, had accompanied Harrod on his initial expedition in 1774.

The settlement was formally established by the Virginia General Assembly in 1785 as Harrodsburg. Four years later, it was named the location for the newly created United States District Court for the District of Kentucky by the Judiciary Act of 1789.

19th century
The Kentucky General Assembly incorporated Harrodsburg in 1836.

During the Civil War, the town was pro-Confederate, but Union control permitted the organization two Union regiments, the 19th Regiment Kentucky Volunteer Infantry and the 11th Regiment Kentucky Volunteer Cavalry.  The 19th Infantry as organized at nearby Camp Harwood for a three-year enlistment commencing January 2, 1862, under the command of Colonel William J. Landram.  Companies A, C, D, and F of the 11th Kentucky Cavalry were organized at Harrodsburg, Kentucky, in July 1862. The remainder of the regiment was organized in Louisville, Kentucky, and mustered in on September 26, 1862, and mustered in for three years under the command of Colonel Alexander W. Holeman.  Following the Battle of Perryville, much of the city was converted into makeshift hospitals; 1600 sick and wounded Confederate soldiers were captured during a raid by the 9th Kentucky Cavalry under Lieutenant Colonel John Boyle on October 10, 1862. The city then remained under martial law for the remainder of the war.

The Louisville Southern Railroad network reached the city in 1888. Its construction commenced in 1884 and ran from Louisville through Shelbyville and Lawrenceburg to Harrodsburg, which was reached in 1888. A spur was constructed to Burgin, where the Louisville Southern joined the Cincinnati Southern's Cincinnati, New Orleans and Texas Pacific Railway CNO&TP mainline.  Now all run and are operated by Norfolk Southern Railway.

20th century
Pioneer Memorial Park (now Old Fort Harrod State Park) was opened on June 16, 1927. In 1936, President Franklin Delano Roosevelt honored the city with a monument honoring the "first permanent settlement west of the Appalachians".

Company D of the 192nd Tank Battalion in the Battle of Bataan was from Harrodsburg.

Geography
Harrodsburg is located at  (37.764019, -84.845974).

Transportation
U.S. 127 runs north–south through Harrodsburg. U.S. 127 Bypass goes around Harrodsburg. U.S. 68 runs east–west through the city, but U.S. 68 turns onto U.S. 127 some of the time in Harrodsburg. KY 152 also runs east–west through the area.

Climate
Harrodsburg is in the humid subtropical climate zone, although verging on a humid continental climate. Summers are hot and humid, and winters are cool with mild periods.

Average high is 87 °F in July and August, the warmest months, with the average lows of 26 °F in January, the coolest month. The highest recorded temperature was 105 °F in September 1954. The lowest recorded temperature was −18 °F in January 1985.

Demographics

As of the 2020 United States Census, 9,064 people and 3,911 households were residing in the city.  The racial makeup of the city was 87.0% White, 6.5% African American, 0.6% Native American, 1.6% Asian, and 4.2% of two or more races. Hispanics or Latinos were 3.7% of the population. 

As of the census of 2000,  8,014 people, 3,449 households, and 2,234 families were residing in the city. The racial makeup of the city was 88.92% White, 7.52% African American, 0.14% Native American, 0.76% Asian,  1.16% from other races, and 1.50% from two or more races. Hispanics or Latinos of any race were 2.15% of the population.

Of the 3,449 households,  31.3% had children under 18 living with them, 45.4% were married couples living together, 15.3% had a female householder with no husband present, and 35.2% were not families. About 32.1% of all households were made up of individuals, and 16.6% had someone living alone who was 65 or older. The average household size was 2.32, and the average family size was 2.91.

The city's age distribution was 25.1% under 18, 9.0% from 18 to 24, 28.2% from 25 to 44, 20.9% from 45 to 64, and 16.8% who were 65 or older. The median age was 36 years. For every 100 females, there were 85.7 males. For every 100 females age 18 and over, there were 79.8 males.

The median income for a household in the city was US $27,500, and for a family was $34,503. Males had a median income of $31,214 versus $21,216 for females. The per capita income for the city was $15,327. About 14.2% of families and 17.1% of the population were below the poverty line, including 21.1% of those under age 18 and 13.2% of those age 65 or over.

Education
Public education is provided by the Mercer County School District. These schools located are within the district:
Harrodsburg Area Technology Center
Mercer County Senior High School
Kenneth D. King Middle School
Mercer County Intermediate School
Mercer County Elementary School
Harlow Early Learning Center
Conover Education Center (Campbellsville University Branch) of Harrodsburg

The Harrodsburg Independent Schools, which operated Harrodsburg High School, merged into the Mercer County Schools in 2006.

Harrodsburg has a lending library, the Mercer County Public Library.

Harrodsburg's Beaumont Inn (1917–present) was known as the Christian Baptist School (1830–1833), Greeneville Institute (1841–1856), Daughters' College (1856–1893), Young Ladies College (1893–1894), Beaumont College (1895–1915), and Daughters' College (1916), prior to becoming Beaumont Inn.

Economy
Hitachi Astemo is based in Harrodsburg.
Corning Incorporated has a plant located in Harrodsburg that makes Gorilla Glass.

Sister city
Unnao, India

Notable people
 Ralph G. Anderson, founder Belcan Corporation, philanthropist
 Jane T. H. Cross (1817–1870), author
 Maria T. Daviess (1814–1896), author; grandmother of Maria Thompson Daviess
 Maria Thompson Daviess (1872–1924), author
 Jason Dunn, National Football League player
 David Winfield Huddleston, Christian author and minister
 Rachel Jackson, wife of President Andrew Jackson
 Frances Wisebart Jacobs, philanthropist
 Dennis Johnson, National Football League player
 William Logan, politician
 Beriah Magoffin, Governor of Kentucky (1859 − 1862) and namesake of Magoffin County, Kentucky
 William Sullivan, politician and lawyer
 John Burton Thompson, politician
 Al Wilson, actor and stunt pilot
 Craig Yeast, National Football League player

See also
Low Dutch Station
Rocky Point Manor

References

External links

 City of Harrodsburg
 Harrodsburg / Mercer County Tourist Commission

Cities in Kentucky
Cities in Mercer County, Kentucky
County seats in Kentucky
Populated places established in 1774
Former county seats in Virginia